Lucienne Peiry, born in Lausanne on 4 September 1961, holds a doctorate (PhD) in the history of art; she is a specialist in Outsider Art ("Art Brut"), an exhibition curator, a lecturer and the author of several publications. She gives lectures in both Switzerland and elsewhere in Europe, and has been teaching Outsider Art at the Swiss Federal Institute of Technology (EPFL, College of Humanities) in Lausanne since 2010. Since 2016, she has also been teaching at the University of Lausanne (Department of Social and Political Sciences)

Biography 
Brought up in the canton of Fribourg, in 1996 Lucienne Peiry was the first woman to obtain a Phd in the History of Art in Lausanne (capital of Switzerland's canton of Vaud). Her thesis was the first to be devoted to "Art Brut" and to the history of the collection that Jean Dubuffet instigated. It was initially published by Flammarion (Paris) as "L'Art Brut," (1997, new editions 1999, 2001, 2006, 2010; English translation 2001, new edition 2006; German translation 2005; Chinese translation 2015); an enlarged and updated version by Flammarion appeared in 2016 (400 pp, 500 illus.).

Formerly, Lucienne Peiry was a journalist with Radio suisse romande (French language radio broadcasts) and, at the same time, a freelance exhibition curator (1987–2001). In that position, she set up a number of temporary exhibitions and added to the museum's holdings by discovering Outsider Art creators in Switzerland and in various other countries of Europe, as well as in notably India, Japan, China, Benin and Bali.

The author of several works and articles on Outsider Art, Lucienne Peiry has also directed numerous publications and exhibition catalogues for the museum, including the cult book "Collection de l'Art Brut, Lausanne," published by Flammarion-Skira of Paris in 2012 (French, English, German).

Lucienne Peiry has encouraged the museum to produce or coproduce (with the filmmakers Philippe Lespinasse and Erika Manoni) several documentaries on Outsider Art creators. In 2001 she launched a teaching program for the Collection de l'Art Brut (young persons guided tours, activities books, workshops, publications), which she continued to develop.

In 2003, she organized an exhibition on Louis Soutter (title: "Louis Soutter et la musique"), jointly with the Basel Museum of Art and the Cantonal Museum of Fine Art Lausanne. Christian Zacharias, director of the Lausanne Chamber Orchestra (OCL) participated in the project. She set up various partnerships with other Swiss cultural institutions, including the Théâtre de Vidy in Lausanne, the Museum of Art and History in Fribourg, and Lausanne's Petit Théâtre.

Appointed Director of Research and International Relations for the Collection de l'Art Brut in 2012, Lucienne Peiry gave up her position as museum director. She is now in charge of promoting the Lausanne museum abroad (exhibitions, lectures) and of seeking out new Outsider Art creators throughout the world (Europe, Asia, Africa, and more). She encourages studies on the creators she discovers, and on behalf of new publications and documentary films. She also lends advice to students and researchers, being called upon as an expert for works on Outsider Art at various universities (including the "hautes écoles") in Switzerland and abroad.

Since 2012, she has also kept up a monthly artistic contribution for the RTS (Radio Télévision Suisse) broadcasting company, on behalf of their "A vous de jouer" (your turn to play) program on Espace 2.

Two trilingual exhibition catalogues were published for the two events.

In 2017 she curated the show "Inextricabilia, Enchevêtrements magiques"  (Inextricabilia – Magical Mesh) at the maison rouge in Paris: in addition to the show's catalogue, many articles and newspaper accounts appeared, together with a major analysis by the art historian Valérie Arconati in the French daily newspaper Libération. Later she curates an exhibition about Curzio Di Giovanni (HEP, Lausanne, 2018) which gathers around 80 drawings shown for the first time to the public, and also the exhibition "Rhinocéros, féroce?", where she creates a dialogue between art and science with rhinoceroses painted and drawn by Gaston Dufour and real stuffed rhinoceroses (Musée cantonal de zoologie, Lausanne, 2019-2020).

She publishes the book "Écrits d'Art Brut. Graphomanes extravagants" (Seuil edition, 2020), which is the catalogue of the exhibition that took place at the Tinguely Museum in Basel in 2021-2022. 

Lucienne Peiry curated the exhibition "Écrits d’Art Brut – Wild Expression & Thought" which was presented from October 2021 to January 2022 at the Tinguely Museum in Basel.

From May to September 2022, her exhibition "Parures d'Art Brut" is on view at the Musée des Beaux-Arts du Locle, in Switzerland.

Since 2021 is she part of the research committee for Art Brut at the Centre Pompidou, which has been founded after the donation of the Bruno Decharme collection.

Lucienne Peiry holds a website called Notes d'Art Brut.

Publications 
This is a non exhaustive list of Lucienne Peiry's publications. The whole list is available on www.notesartbrut.ch
Le Jardin de la mémoire, Paris, Allia, 2021.
Écrits d'Art Brut. Graphomanes extravagants, Paris, Le Seuil, 2020.
Le Livre de pierre. Fernando Nannetti, Paris, Allia, 2020.
Rhinocéros féroce?, under the direction of Lucienne Peiry and Michel Sartori, Lausanne, Musée cantonal de zoologie, 2019.
Curzio di Giovanni. Face-à-face, Lausanne, HEPL, 2018.
Inextricabilia. Enchevêtrements magiques, under the direction of Lucienne Peiry, co-published by Flammarion and La maison rouge, Paris, 2017.
 L'Art Brut, Flammarion, Paris, 1997, 2006, 2010, 2016. 
 L'Art Brut, Shanghai, Presses universitaires de Shanghai, 2015. 
 L'Art Brut dans le monde, Infolio and Collection de l'Art Brut, Gollion and Lausanne, 2014. 
 Collection de l'Art Brut, with Sarah Lombardi, Skira, Geneva, 2012. 
 Guo Fengyi, Collection de l'Art Brut, Lausanne, 2011.
 Nannetti, under the direction of Lucienne Peiry, Infolio and Collection de l'Art Brut, Gollion and Lausanne, 2011. 
 Art Brut du Japon, under the direction of Lucienne Peiry, Infolio and Collection de l'Art Brut, Gollion and Lausanne, 2008. 
 Le Royaume de Nek Chand, under the direction of Lucienne Peiry, Flammarion, Paris, 2005, 2006. 
 Dubuffet & l'Art Brut, edition 5 Continents, Milan, 2005. 
 Écriture en délire, under the direction of Lucienne Peiry, 5 Continents and Collection de l'Art Brut, Milan and Lausanne, 2004. 
 Art Brut. The Origins of Outsider Art, Flammarion, Paris, 2001  (Broché ), 2006  (Broché )

References

Sources 

 Portrait de Lucienne Peiry, Le Temps, by Marie-Pierre Genecand, 17 Décembre 2021.

 "Lucienne Peiry "Rhinocéros féroce ?" [archive]", Vertigo, RTS, 23 Décembre 2019
Virginie Nussbaum, Dialogues de rhinocéros, Le Temps, 25 Octobre 2019
 Florence Millioud-Henriques, Conversation entre rhinocéros, 24 Heures, 10 Octobre 2019
Laurence Chauvy, L'Art Brut intéresse aussi la Chine, Le Temps, 2015/03/31.
 Florence Milloud Henriques, "L'Art Brut" se lit en Chine et en chinois, 24 Heures, 2015/03/31.
 France Inter, Lucienne Peiry, 2014/08/08.
 Christine Gonzalez, Radio Télévision Suisse, Vertigo, Lucienne Peiry, l'Art Brut dans le monde, 2014/06/06.
 Françoise Monnin, Ni Tanjung. L'éblouie de Bali, Artension, 2014/08/02.
 Christophe Büchi: Schatzsucherin der Art Brut – Die Kunsthistorikerin Lucienne Peiry, Neue Zürcher Zeitung, 7. Octobre 2013.
 Patricia Brambilla, Lucienne Peiry: dénicheuse de talents bruts, 2012/10/29.
 Jonas Pulver. Lucienne Peiry, traqueuse d'Art Brut, Le Temps, 2012/10/27
Biografie bei der Bibliothèque cantonale et universitaire de Lausanne
« Lucienne Peiry », sur la base de données des personnalités vaudoises sur la plateforme « Patrinum » de la Bibliothèque cantonale et universitaire de Lausanne.
 François Ansermet et Pierre Magistretti, Fondation Agalma, Entretien avec Lucienne Peiry.
24 Heures 2001/10/27 & 2003/01/27, 
24 Heures 2003/03/22-23,  & 2009/03/10,  & 2001/10/27
 Françoise Jaunin, Le Portrait 24 Heures 2008/05/28, 
L'Hebdo Cahier spécial les 80 qui font Vaud, 2004/25/13, p. XV

External links 
 Notes d'Art Brut, site internet de Lucienne Peiry
 Nouveau(x) monde(s) à Lausanne – swissinfo
 Art brut, l'art en jeu
 Outsider Art Sicilia

Swiss curators
Swiss women curators
Swiss women educators
People from the canton of Vaud
People from Lausanne
Swiss educators
1961 births
Living people
20th-century Swiss educators
21st-century Swiss educators
20th-century Swiss women
21st-century Swiss women
20th-century women educators
21st-century women educators